Hartl is a Germanic surname. Notable people with the surname include:

Albert Hartl (1904–1982), German Nazi Party member
Daniel Hartl (born 1943), American biologist
Franz-Ulrich Hartl (born 1957), German biochemist
Hans-Werner Hartl (born 1946), German footballer
Jan Hartl (born 1952), Czech actor
Karel Hartl (born 1924), Czech dog breeder and founder of the Czechoslovakian Wolfdog. 
Karl Hartl (1899–1978), Austrian film director
Manuel Hartl (born 1985), Austrian footballer
Patrik Hartl (born 1976), Czech writer
Raphael Hartl (born 1975), Austrian rower
Roger Härtl, American neurosurgeon
Valentin Härtl (1894–1966), German violist and violinist
Wolfgang Hartl (born 1941), Austrian sprint canoeist

Surnames from given names

German-language surnames